Atletismo Chapín Xerez Deportivo FC is a track team from Jerez de la Frontera founded in 1989. 

It stood out during the decade of the 2000s, when it won eight consecutive championships in Spain of Clubs, and four Spanish Cups, among other titles.

In 2014, the club reached a cooperation agreement to Xerez Deportivo FC to enter the sports association.

Honours
 Spanish Championship 
 Winners (8): 2001, 2002, 2003, 2004, 2005, 2006, 2007, 2008

 Spanish Cups
 Winners (4): 2002, 2003, 2004, 2006

See also
Xerez Deportivo FC
Xerez DFC Fútbol Sala
Club de Rugby Xerez Deportivo FC

References

Athletics in Spain
Football clubs in Andalusia